Erich Heckel (31 July 1883 – 27 January 1970) was a German painter and printmaker, and a founding member of the group Die Brücke ("The Bridge") which existed 1905–1913. His work was part of the art competitions at the 1928 Summer Olympics and the 1932 Summer Olympics.

Biography
Heckel was born in Döbeln, Saxony, the son of a railway engineer. Between 1897 and 1904 he attended the Realgymnasium in Chemnitz, before studying architecture in Dresden. He left after three terms, shortly after the foundation of  Die Brücke, an artists' group of which he was secretary and treasurer. The other founder-members, also architectural students, were Ernst Ludwig Kirchner, Karl Schmidt-Rottluff and Fritz Bleyl.  He worked in the office of the architect Wilhelm Kreis until July 1907, when he resigned to become a full-time artist.

Career
Heckel met the other founding members of Die Brücke, Ernst Ludwig Kirchner, Karl Schmidt-Rottluff, and Fritz Bleyl, while studying architecture in Dresden. The foursome equally regarded pursuing a degree in architecture as a compromise with their respectable middle-class parents who would have never supported them, had they wanted to study art.
Heckel attended the Dresden Polytechnic Institute for only eighteen months, after which time he accepted a job as a draughtsman at Wilhem Kreis's architectural studio. He was able to use the position for the benefit of the Brücke. When the firm was asked to design an exhibition room for the lamp manufacturer Max Seifert, Heckel was able to persuade the industrialist that it was worthwhile giving wall space and displays to the Brucke for an exhibition.

Art
As a member of Die Brücke, Heckel often filled the role of business manager, which allowed the collective to network with other upcoming artists at the time, such as the Munich-based Franz Marc. This subsequently led to greater publicity for the collective, such as their mention in the almanac of Franz Marc's own artistic coalition, the Blaue Reiter.

It is worthwhile to note that with the exception of one favorable review by Paul Fetcher in the leading Dresden newspaper Dresdner Neueste Nachrichten, the exhibition in Löbtau at the factory of the lamp manufacturer Max Seifert was considered to be a flop. In addition, Heckel's poster, no longer extant, had been barred from public display by the Dresden police.
In 1906 and 1907 the Die Brücke had another exhibition in Löbtau, devoted exclusively to graphics and including a group of woodcuts by Wassily Kandinsky. Unfortunately, the group once again failed to strike a chord with the public.
However, much more noteworthy and ironically also notorious, were the next three annual shows by the Die Brücke, this time held in the fashionable Emil Richter Gallery. In large, silent rooms, expensively furnished and smothered with lush carpets, the group's unconventional paintings and prints struck a foreseeably strident chord, amongst them notably a nude poster of a woman that ruffled many a complacent Dresdener.

Heckel and other members of Die Brücke greatly admired the work of Edvard Munch, and aimed to make a "bridge" between traditional neo-romantic German painting and modern expressionist painting. The four founding members made much use of the print as a cheap and quick medium with which to produce affordable art.

Primitive art was also an inspiration to the members of the Die Brücke. It was Heckel's brother who introduced the group to African sculpture, and it is noted that their acceptance of primitive art, which was to fortify decisively the expressive yearnings of European artists- Was unequivocal.  It is through this style that they found a source of strength in the barbaric figures.

From the World War I to the World War II
In December 1911, Heckel moved from Dresden to Berlin. Die Brücke was dissolved in 1913. Heckel volunteered for service in Berlin when the war broke out in 1914. Although he underwent a brief training period, he was ultimately rejected by the army for being too old. He then turned to the Red Cross, joining a hospital train in Flanders in March 1915 as a medical orderly. It was stationed successively in Roeselare, Ostend and Ghent. The platoon was assembled by Walter Kaesbach, a curator from the National Gallery of Berlin, and included painters such as Max Kaus, Otto Herbig and Anton Kerschbaumer, as well as the poet Ernst Morwitz. At a certain moment in Roeselare, Heckel found himself in the same hospital train as Max Beckmann. From May 1915 until the end of the war in November 1918, Heckel served in the Ostend emergency hospital. Housed in the railway station, it was home to a true artists’ colony. The orderlies painted, made woodcuts and read and discussed literature and poetry. They adorned the building with murals and window decorations and produced special works at Christmas. Heckel befriended James Ensor who invited him into his house and his studio. He also continued his artistic activities in Germany. On the home front, he established contacts with collectors and prepared for exhibitions. As a draughtsman, he made numerous sketches of the places he visited and the people he observed. But as a painter, the Flemish landscape and North Sea created the deepest impression, especially the sunlight penetrating the unusual cloud formations. 

Between 1922 and 1924 Heckel painted one small, arched room  at the invitation of the Angermuseum on the ground floor of the museum. It is now called the Heckelraum. The mural paintings, which were subsequently given the title Lebenstufen (in English: Stages in Life), are considered to be the most important surviving wall paintings of German Expressionism.

In 1937 the Nazi Party declared his work "degenerate"; it forbade him to show his work in public, and more than 700 items of his art were confiscated from German museums. By 1944 all of his woodcut blocks and print plates had been destroyed.
  
After World War II Heckel lived at Gaienhofen near Lake Constance, teaching at the Karlsruhe Academy until 1955. He continued painting until his death in Radolfzell in 1970.

Legacy
Like most members of Die Brücke, he was a prolific printmaker: Dube's catalogues raisonné describe with  465 woodcuts, 375 etchings, and 400 lithographs. More than 200 of them, mostly etchings, are from the last seven years of his life.

A major retrospective exhibition, Erich Heckel – His Work in the 1920s, was held October 2004 – February 2005 at the Brücke Museum in Berlin.

In 2000, Heckel's Dangaster Dorflandschaft (Dangast village landscape) (1909) was sold for £1.21 million at Sotheby's in London.

David Bowie based the cover of his 1977 album "Heroes" on Heckel's painting Roquairol. The same painting also provided the basis for the cover of Iggy Pop's 1977 album The Idiot.

Critical reception
The critic James Auer has said that Heckel's Franzi Standing
 in many ways encapsulates the principal virtues of the entire Expressionist movement. At once frank and respectful, daring and compassionate, it depicts a girl-woman on the cusp of adolescence, innocent and free yet, at the same time, curious and knowing.

References

External links

 Heckel – Fränzi reclining
 Erich Heckel's 1920s work at the Brücke
 works of the artist at "Museumsportal Schleswig-Holstein"
 Available Works & Biography  Galerie Ludorff, Düsseldorf, Germany

1883 births
1970 deaths
People from Döbeln
People from the Kingdom of Saxony
20th-century German painters
20th-century German male artists
German male painters
German Expressionist painters
Commanders Crosses of the Order of Merit of the Federal Republic of Germany
Recipients of the Pour le Mérite (civil class)
20th-century German printmakers
Olympic competitors in art competitions